Mucky Duck may refer to:-

 English hotels known as the Black Swan
 Colloquial term for black swans - see - Black swan emblems and popular culture
 The Western Australian bush band Mucky Duck Bush Band
 McGonigel's Mucky Duck, a live music venue in Houston